Ileana Perez Velazquez is a Cuban-American composer and Professor of Composition at Williams College since 2000. She was born in Cienfuegos, Cuba, and then studied as an undergraduate in piano and composition from the Higher Institute of Arts (ISA), Havana, Cuba before moving to the United States for graduate work in composition at Dartmouth College and Indiana University, where she earned her DMA.

Her work draws from a range of influences, which a New York Times review characterized having an "otherworldly quality mirrored in the accompaniment and sounding like a musical expression of the Latin American literary form magical realism." In contrast, one of her compositions performed in 2019, Tu, paz mia,  was reviewed as "Processional and solemn, the work is Baroque in tone."  She has been commissioned to compose works by many organizations, including the 2015 Commission from the Fromm Music Foundation at Harvard University. She has written works for numerous performers and ensembles, including Continuum  (New York City), Momenta String quartet (NYC), Cassatt Quartet (NYC), Ensemble Dal Niente from Chicago

Festival performances of her work includes venues such as the Sonidos de las Americas Cuba Festival at Carnegie Hall, by the American Composers Orchestra Chamber Players, and the  Composers Now Festival in New York City, but also in Cuba, the United States, throughout South and Central America, Europe, China, and the Middle East.

Recordings
 2017 - A Cascade of Light in a Resonance Universe: Music of Ileana Perez Velazquez, Albany Records
 2008 - An Enchanted Being: Music of Ileana Perez Velazquez, Albany Records

References 

American entertainers of Cuban descent
American musicians of Cuban descent
Williams College faculty
People from Cienfuegos
Dartmouth College alumni
Indiana University alumni
American women composers
American composers
Year of birth missing (living people)
Living people
American women academics
21st-century American women